This is a list of members of the South Australian Legislative Council from 1959 to 1962.

 Labor MLC Frank Condon died on 15 July 1961. Alfred Kneebone was elected to fill the vacancy on 16 September.

References
Parliament of South Australia — Statistical Record of the Legislature

Members of South Australian parliaments by term
20th-century Australian politicians